Evelyn Pierrepont, 1st Duke of Kingston-upon-Hull,  (c. 16655 March 1726) was an English aristocrat, the third son of Robert Pierrepont of Thoresby, Nottinghamshire, and his wife Elizabeth Evelyn (daughter of John Evelyn), and the grandson of William Pierrepont of Thoresby. He was born at West Dean, Wiltshire.

Political career

He had been the member of parliament for East Retford before his accession to the peerage as fifth Earl of Kingston-upon-Hull in 1690. While serving as one of the commissioners for the union with Scotland, he was created Marquess of Dorchester in 1706, and took a leading part in the business of the House of Lords. He was made a privy councillor and in 1715 was created Duke of Kingston-upon-Hull; afterwards serving as Lord Privy Seal and Lord President of the Council. The Duke was a prominent figure in the fashionable society of his day.

Family
His first wife was Lady Mary Feilding, a daughter of William Feilding, 3rd Earl of Denbigh, and his wife Mary King, whom he married in 1687. They had three daughters and a son:
Lady Mary Pierrepont (died 1762), who married the diplomat Edward Wortley-Montagu
Lady Frances Pierrepont (died 1761), who married John Erskine, Earl of Mar
Lady Evelyn Pierrepont (died 1727), who married John Leveson-Gower, 1st Earl Gower, and was mother of Gertrude, Duchess of Bedford
William Pierrepont, Earl of Kingston-upon-Hull, who died of smallpox, aged 20, in July 1713. He married and had a daughter Frances (died 1795) and a son Evelyn.

His second wife was Lady Isabella Bentinck, daughter of Hans William Bentinck, 1st Earl of Portland, whom he married in 1714. They had two daughters:
Lady Caroline Pierrepont (died 1753), who married Thomas Brand (senior), MP 
Lady Anne Pierrepont (1719–1739)
He was succeeded by his grandson Evelyn, son of William.

References

|-

1650s births
1726 deaths
Lord Presidents of the Council
Lords Privy Seal
101
Knights of the Garter
Pierrepont, Evelyn
Evelyn
Members of the Kit-Kat Club